Haukur Ingi Guðnason (born 8 September 1978, in Keflavik) is a retired Icelandic footballer who last played for Grindavík.

Club career
Haukur Ingi began his career with Keflavík Football Club, joining English giants Liverpool in 1997. He spent three years at Anfield without breaking into the first team, and returned to Iceland in 2000. He had a loan spell KR before returning to Keflavik and moving on to Fylkir in 2003. Haukur stayed with Fylkir until the end of 2008 when he joined his former club Keflavík. Haukur was a pacy winger or forward.

International career
Haukur Ingi has represented Iceland, making his debut in a friendly match in June 1998 against South Africa.

Personal life
Haukur Ingi's father is Guðni Kjartansson, a former player and coach of both Keflavík Football Club and the Icelandic national team who was named Icelandic Sportsman of the Year in 1973, the first footballer to win the award. Haukur Ingi married Ragnhildur Steinunn Jónsdóttir, a former Miss Iceland and TV personality, in 2018; the couple have been together since 1996 and have four children.

References

External links
 Keflavík Football Club profile
 Profile at LFCHistory.net
 
Haukur Ingi Gudnosson Where is he now ?

1978 births
Living people
Haukur Ingi Gudnason
Haukur Ingi Gudnason
Haukur Ingi Gudnason
Haukur Ingi Gudnason
Liverpool F.C. players
Haukur Ingi Gudnason
Association football forwards
Haukur Ingi Gudnason